Love Guru is a 2009 Indian Kannada film directed by Prashant Raj. The film starred Tarun Chandra and Radhika Pandit in leading roles. The music of the film was composed by Joshua Sridhar.

Plot
Kushi (Radhika Pandit), Pratham (Tarun) and Sharan attend an interview where all the 3 are selected. Pratham starts loving Kushi and proposes her but everyone thinks he was trying to fool her as it was 1 April. Later she marries her boss Abhi (Dilip Raj) not knowing that Pratham is in love with her. At her wedding reception, Pratham gives her a rose and announces in front of all that he loves her. But Kushi and Abhi ignore the incident as they think that he wants to give a shock to them.. But he continues to pine for Kushi, and, finally, quits his job much to Kushi's dismay. When another woman enters his life, the heart-broken Pratham decides to start life afresh.

Cast
 Tarun Chandra as Pratham
 Radhika Pandit as Kushi
 Yagna Shetty
 Dileep Raj as Abhi
 Sharan
 Srinivasa Murthy
 Jai Jagadish
 Ramesh Bhat
 Chitra Shenoy
 Aindrita Ray (Cameo Appearance)

Track listing

Reception

Critical response 

R G Vijayasarathy of Rediff.com scored the film at 3.5 out of 5 stars and says "All the actors have performed well. This is certainly Tarun's best performance till date. Radhika Pandit is one of the best actresses to appear on the marquee in the recent times. She breathes life into Kushi. Veteran artists Jai Jagadish, Sreenivasa Murthy, Ramesh Bhat, Chitra Shenoy are also perfect in their roles. But the comedy sequences do not gel with the mood of film. Even if you find the climax offbeat, you will enjoy the film. Love Guru is certainly a different kind of film, worth watching". A critic from The New Indian Express wrote ""Yaaru Kooda Ninna Haage" and "Thangaali Tandeya" are well picturised. Cameraman Saba Kumar has done a wonderful job with the songs. The camera work captures the sequences quite effectively. The art work is fine and matches the film's background. "Love Guru" is a must watch for its freshness, though the story is not off beat". B S Srivani from  Deccan Herald wrote "Radhika’s smartness is evident in her choice of roles. Yajna Shetty and Harish Raj are wasted. Jnanamurthy’s camera and the graphics guys are diligent; Joshua presents pleasing , yet eerily familiar tunes. What lingers from the film is the director’s hesitation which finally turns into conviction. Inexperience in some departments is somewhat compensated by his overall design". A critic from The Times of India scored the film at 3 out of 5 stars and says "Radhika Pandit steals the show with her brilliant expressions, lively action and excellent dialogue delivery. Tarun and Dilip Raj are impressive. Sharans comedy is a treat to watch. Joshuva Sridhars music is good. Gnanamurthy''s camerawork is commendable".

References

External links
 

2000s Kannada-language films
2009 films
2009 romance films
Films scored by Joshua Sridhar
Films directed by Prashant Raj
Indian romance films